Georges Hebbelinck (Ghent, 4 March 1916 – Ghent, 3 October 1964) was a Flemish writer.

Bibliography
 Kroesbal uit het Zoniënwoud (1957)
 Het meisje in de kelder (1958)
 De rozen van Kazanlik (1959)
 De journalist (1960)
 Kent gij de zoo van Antwerpen? (1960)
 De trein reed door het dal (1962)

Awards
 1962 – Arkprijs van het Vrije Woord

See also
 Flemish literature

Sources
 Georges Hebbelinck (Dutch)
 Georges Hebbelinck (Dutch)
 G.J. van Bork en P.J. Verkruijsse, De Nederlandse en Vlaamse auteurs (1985)

1916 births
1964 deaths
Flemish writers
Ark Prize of the Free Word winners